Velike Brusnice is a settlement at the foothills of the Gorjanci range to the east of Novo Mesto in southeastern Slovenia. The entire City Municipality of Novo Mesto is part of the traditional region of Lower Carniola and is now included in the Southeast Slovenia Statistical Region.

The parish church in the village is dedicated to the Holy Cross and belongs to the Roman Catholic Diocese of Novo Mesto. It was built in 1846 in the Baroque style. The restoration expert Franc Avsec served as parish priest here from 1899 to 1900. A second church in the settlement is dedicated to the Holy Family. It is a Romanesque building with a mid-15th-century wall painting of Saint Christopher on the south exterior wall of the nave. It was extended in the late 16th to early 17th centuries.

References

External links
Velike Brusnice on Geopedia

Populated places in the City Municipality of Novo Mesto